The Russian route A340 is a Russian federal highway, connecting Russian city Ulan-Ude and Mongolia.

Until 2010, the route was designated as A165. The entire route is part of AH3.

Gallery

References 

Roads in Russia